Three Rivers DC v Governor of the Bank of England [2001 UKHL 16]  is a UK banking law and EU law case concerning government liability for the protection of depositors and the preliminary ruling procedure in the European Union.

Facts
Depositors in the UK branch of Bank of Credit and Commerce International (BCCI) sought damages from the Bank of England for failing in its supervisory duties. The Bank had granted BCCI authorisation in a way that breached the First Banking Directive 77/780. The government argued that the Directive was not intended to give rights to individual depositors.

Clarke J dismissed the action, and the Court of Appeal by a majority (Hirst and Robert Walker LJJ, Auld LJ dissenting) dismissed the appeal.

The depositors had to base their claim on the intentional tort of misfeasance in public office because in English law, it was not possible for the regulatory authority to be held liable for negligence in the exercise of its supervisory functions.

Judgment
The House of Lords held that the Directive was only a first step toward mutual recognition of authorisations of member states to credit institutions, and individual depositor protection was not an objective of the Directive. There was no need to refer to the ECJ. The delays and costs of making a reference were great, given the very small likelihood that they would have made a wrong interpretation.

Lord Hope said the Directive did not define a depositor and so did not define the class of persons who might have rights. Article 3(1) obliged member states to require credit institutions to have authority to operate, but BCCI had commenced before the Directive. Articles 6 and 7 did not impose any duty of supervision on national authorities.

See also

European Union law
UK banking law
Watkins v Home Office and others (UKHL appeal with important implications for the tort of misfeasance in public office.)

Notes
This case essentially establishes that the Hansard can be used as an external aid to statutory interpretation.

References

House of Lords cases
Court of Justice of the European Union case law
Bank of England